Krasna Hora is a name of several localities

 Krásná Hora, village in Vysočina Region, the Czech Republic
 Krasna Hora, urban-type settlement in Donetsk Oblast, Ukraine